Niilo is a male given name. People named Niilo include:
Niilo Wälläri (1897–1967), Finnish Socialist, syndicalist leader
Niilo Yli-Vainio (1920–1981), Finnish Pentecostalist leader
Niilo Halonen (born 1940), Finnish former ski jumper who competed between 1960 and 1967
Niilo Paasivirta, Finnish internet personality 
Niilo Jääskinen (born 1958), Finnish lawyer and politician
Niilo Sevänen (born 1979), Finnish death metal musician 

As a surname
 Tiit Niilo (born 1962), Estonian politician

See also
2972 Niilo (1939 TB), a Main-belt Asteroid discovered in 1939

Estonian masculine given names
Finnish masculine given names